
List of railway stations in Serbia.

A

Adaševci
Adrani
Adrovac
Aleksandrovo Predgrađe
Aleksa Šantić
Aleksinac
Alibunar
Apatin
Apatin Fabrika

B
Babin Potok
Babljak
Bačka Topola
Bački Vinogradi
Badnjevac
Bagrdan
Bajmok
Baluga
Banatski Miloševo Polje
Banatski Karlovac
Banatsko Miloševo
Banatsko Novo Selo
Banjska
Barajevo
Barajevo Centar
Barlovo
Batajnica
Batočina
Bela Palanka
Belanovac
Beli Potok
Beloljin
Belotince
Beograd
Beograd Centar
Beograd Dunav
Beška
Bikovo
Bistrica Na Limu
Bočar
Bogaraš
Bogojevo
Bogojevo Selo
Bogutovačka Banja
Bor
Bor Teretna
Boračko
Božurat
Braljina
Branešci
Bresničići
Brestovac
Brestovi
Brezonik
Brodarevo
Brodica
Brusnik
Brvenik
Brzan
Buđanovci
Bujanovac
Bukovče
Bukovička Rampa

C
Cerovo
Cerovo-Ražanj
Crepaja
Crkvica
Crnomasnica
Crvena Reka
Crvenčevo
Crveni Breg
Crveni Krst
Crvenka
Cvetojevac

Č
Čačak
Čapljinac
Češljeva Bara
Čiflik
Činiglavci
Čoka
Čokonjar
Čonoplja
Čortanovci
Čortanovci Dunav

Ć
Ćele Kula
Ćićevac
Ćuprija

D
Debeli Lug
Debeljača
Dešiška
Dimitrovgrad
Divci
Dobre Strane
Dolac
Doline
Doljevac
Donje Jarinje
Donje Zuniće
Donji Ljubeš
Dragačevo
Dragobraća
Dražanj-Šepšin
Dren
Drenovac
Drenovački Kik

Dž
Džep
Džurovo

Đ
Đorđevo
Đunis
Đurđevo Polje

E
Elemir

F
Futog

G
Gabrić
Gajdobra
Gilje
Glibovac
Glumač
Godomin
Golubinci
Goričani
Gornjane
Gornji Breg
Gornji Ljubeš
Gradac
Gramada
Grdelica
Grejač
Grlica
Grljan
Grošnica
Gruža
Guberevac

H
Hadžićevo
Hajdukovo
Horgoš

I
Ibarska Slatina
Inđija
Inđija Selo
Iverak

J
Jablanica
Jabuka
Jagodina
Jajinci
Jasenica
Jasenovik
Jasikovo
Jelen Do
Jošanička Banja
Jovac
Jovanovac

K
Kać
Kačarevo
Kalenić
Kanjiža
Kaona
Karađorđev Park
Karavukovo
Karlovački Vinogradi
Kasapovac
Kastrat
Kaznovići
Kijevo
Kikinda
Kisač
Klenak
Klenje
Kljajićevo
Knezevac
Knić
Knjaževac
Kobišnica
Kočane
Kolari
Korman
Kosančić Ivan
Kosanica
Kosanička Rača
Kosjerić
Kosovska Mitrovica
Kovačevac
Kovačica
Kragujevac
Kraljevo
Kriveljski Most
Kriveljski Potok
Krnjača
Krnjevo-Trnovče
Kučevo
Kukići
Kukujevci-Erdevik
Kula
Kumane
Kuršumlija
Kusadak

L
Lajkovac
Lanište
Lapovo
Lapovo Ranž.Staj.
Lapovo Varoš
Lastra
Lazarevac
Lepenički Most
Leposavić
Lešak
Leskovac
Leskovac Kolubarski
Leskovice
Leskovo
Letovica
Lipe
Lipovica
Lovćenac
Lozno
Lozovik-Saraorci
Lučice
Lučina
Lugavčina
Lukavac Kolubarski
Lukićevo
Lukomir
Lužane

Lj
Ljubičevski most
Ljubinje
Ljuša
Ljutovo

M
Majdanpek
Mala Ivanča
Mala Krsna
Mali Beograd
Mali Iđoš
Mali Iđoš Polje
Mali Izvor
Mali Krivelj
Mali Požarevac
Malošište
Markovac
Martinci
Martonoš
Mataruška Banja
Matejevac
Međurovo
Melenci
Merdare
Mezgraja
Milatovac
Milavčići
Miloševac
Miloševo
Minićevo
Mladenovac
Mlađevo
Momin Kamen
Mrsać
Mršinci
Mustapić

N
Naumovićevo
Negotin
Nenadovac
Nikinci
Nikolinci
Niš
Niš Ranžirna
Niševac
Niška Banja
Nova Pazova
Novi Bečej
Novi Beograd
Novi Sad
Novi Sivac
Novo Selo
Novoselske Livade
Nozrina

O
Odžaci
Odžaci Kalvarija
Orlovat Stajalište
Orom
Osipaonica
Osipaonica Stajalište
Ostojićevo
Ostrovica
Otanj
Ovča
Ovčar Banja

P
Padej
Palanka
Palić
Palilula
Palilulska Rampa
Palojska Rosulja
Pančevački Most
Pančevo Glavna
Pančevo Strelište
Pančevo Varoš
Pančevo Vojlovica
Pantelej
Paraćin
Parage
Pavliš
Pečenjevce
Pepeljevac
Petrovac-Gložan
Petrovaradin
Pinosava
Pirot
Piskanja
Plandište
Platićevo
Pločnik
Počekovina
Podina
Podlokanj
Podvis
Poljice
Polumir
Požarevac
Požega
Prahovo
Prahovo Pristanište
Predejane
Preševo
Priboj
Priboj Leskovački
Priboj Vranjski
Pribojska Banja
Prigrevica
Prijepolje
Prijepolje Teretna
Prijevor
Progorelica
Prokuplje
Prosek
Pukovac
Pusto Polje
Putinci

R
Rabrovac
Rabrovo-Klenje
Rača
Radinac
Radov Dol
Rajac
Rakovica
Ralja
Ralja Smederevska
Rasna
Ratare
Ratkovo
Raška
Ražana
Rečica
Resnik
Resnik Kragujevački
Rgošte
Rgotina
Ribnica Zlatiborska
Ripanj
Ripanj Kolonija
Ripanj Tunel
Ristanovića Polje
Ristovac
Rogljevo
Rudare
Rudnica
Ruma
Rvati

S
Samaila
Samari
Saraorci
Sebeš
Selačka Reka
Senta
Sevojno
Sićevo
Sikirica-Ratari
Sinjac
Sirča
Sivac
Skenderovo
Skobalj
Slovac
Smederevo
Sočanica
Sokolovica
Sombor
Sonta
Sopot Kosmajski
Sremska Mitrovica
Sremski Karlovci
Stalać
Staničenje
Stapari
Stara Pazova
Staro Selo
Staro Trubarevo
Stepanovićevo
Stepojevac
Stevanac
Stig
Stubal
Subotica
Subotica Jav.Skladišta
Subotica Predgrađe
Sukovo
Supovački Most
Sušica
Suva Morava
Svetozar Miletić
Svrljig
Svrljiški Miljkovac

Š
Šabac
Šajinovac
Šebešić
Šid
Štrpci
Šumarice
Šušulajka

T
Tabakovac
Tabakovačka Reka
Tamnić
Tavankut
Tešica
Timok
Tomaševac
Tomića Brdo
Topčider
Toplica Milan
Toplička Mala Plana
Toplički Badnjevac
Tošin Bunar
Trbušani
Tripkova
Trnavac
Trnjani
Trupale
Tubići
Turija Kučevska

U
Uljma
Umčari
Ušće
Uzdin
Užice
Užice Teretna
Uzići

V
Valač
Valjevo
Valjevski Gradac
Vasiljevac
Velika Plana
Velika Župa
Veliki Borak
Veliki Jovanovac
Veliko Orašje
Veljkovo
Verušić
Vinarci
Visoka
Vitanovac
Vitkovac
Vitkovac Staj.
Vladičin Han
Vladimirovac
Vlajkovac
Vlaole
Vlaole Selo
Vlaško Polje
Vodanj
Voganj
Voluja
Vranje
Vranjska Banja
Vranovo
Vratarnica
Vražogrnac
Vrbas
Vrbnica
Vrčin
Vreoci
Vršac
Vrtište
Vučkovica
Vukov Spomenik

Z
Zablaće
Zagrađe
Zaječar
Zavod
Zemun
Zemunsko Polje
Zlakusa
Zlatibor
Zlatica
Zmajevo
Zrenjanin
Zrenjanin Fabrika
Zuce
Zvečan
Zvižd

Ž
Žednik
Žitorađa
Žitorađa Centar
Živkovo

References

External links

Serbia

Railway stations
Railway stations